Rana  is a genus of frogs commonly known as the Holarctic true frogs, pond frogs or brown frogs. Members of this genus are found through much of Eurasia and western North America. Many other genera were formerly included here.
These true frogs are usually largish species characterized by their slim waists and wrinkled skin; many have thin ridges running along their backs, but they generally lack "warts" as in typical toads. They are excellent jumpers due to their long, slender legs. The typical webbing found on their hind feet allows for easy movement through water. Coloration is mostly greens and browns above, with darker and yellowish spots.

Distribution and habitat
Many frogs in this genus breed in early spring, although subtropical and tropical species may breed throughout the year. Males of most of the species are known to call, but a few species are thought to be voiceless.  Females lay eggs in rafts or large, globular clusters, and can produce up to 20,000 at one time.

Diet
Rana species feed mainly on insects and invertebrates, but swallow anything they can fit into their mouths, including small vertebrates. Among their predators are egrets, crocodiles, and snakes.

Systematics
Some 50 to 100 extant species are now placed in this genus by various authors; many other species formerly placed in Rana are now placed elsewhere. Frost restricted Rana to the Old World true frogs and the Eurasian brown and pond frogs of the common frog R. temporaria group, although other authors disagreed with this arrangement. In 2016, a consortium of Rana researchers from throughout Europe, Asia, and North America revised the group, and reported that the arrangement of Frost (2006) resulted in nonmonophyletic groups. Yuan et al. (2016) included all the North American ranids within Rana, and used subgenera for the well-differentiated species groups within Rana. Both of these classifications are presented below.

Genera recently split from Rana are Babina, Clinotarsus (including Nasirana), Glandirana, Hydrophylax, Hylarana, Lithobates, Odorrana (including Wurana), Pelophylax, Pulchrana, Sanguirana, and Sylvirana. Of these, Odorrana and Lithobates are so closely related to Rana proper, they could conceivably be included here once again. The others seem to be far more distant relatives, in particular Pelophylax.

New species are still being described in some numbers.  A number of extinct species are in the genus, including Rana basaltica, from Miocene deposits in China.

Species
The following species are recognised in the genus Rana:

 Rana amurensis (Boulenger, 1886) – Siberian tree frog, Siberian wood frog, Amur brown frog
 Rana arvalis – Moor frog
 Rana asiatica – Central Asiatic frog, Asian frog
 Rana aurora – Northern red-legged frog
 Rana boylii – Foothill yellow-legged frog
 Rana cascadae – Cascades frog
 Rana chaochiaoensis – Chaochiao frog
 Rana chensinensis – Asiatic grass frog, Chinese brown frog
 Rana chevronta – Chevron-spotted brown frog
 Rana coreana – Korean brown frog
 Rana dalmatina – Agile frog
 Rana draytonii – California red-legged frog
 Rana dybowskii – Dybowski's frog
 Rana graeca – Greek stream frog, Greek frog
 Rana hanluica
 Rana huanrenensis – Huanren frog
 Rana iberica – Iberian frog
 Rana italica – Italian stream frog
 Rana japonica – Japanese brown frog
 Rana jiemuxiensis – Jiemuxi brown frog
 Rana johnsi – Johns' groove-toed frog
 Rana kobai – Ryukyu brown frog
 Rana kukunoris – Plateau brown frog
 Rana latastei – Italian agile frog, Lataste's frog
 Rana longicrus – Taipa frog
 Rana luanchuanensis
 Rana luteiventris – Columbia spotted frog
 Rana macrocnemis – Long-legged wood frog, Caucasus frog, Turkish frog, Brusa frog
 Rana maoershanensis
 Rana muscosa – Southern mountain yellow-legged frog
 Rana neba
 Rana omeimontis – Omei brown frog, Omei wood frog
 Rana ornativentris – Montane brown frog, Nikkō frog
 Rana pirica – Hokkaidō frog
 Rana pretiosa – Oregon spotted frog
 Rana pseudodalmatina
 †Rana pueyoi
 Rana pyrenaica – Pyrenean frog, Pyrenees frog
 Rana sakuraii – Stream brown frog, Napparagawa frog
 Rana sauteri – Sauter's brown frog, Kanshirei village frog, Taiwan groove-toed frog, Taiwan pseudotorrent frog
 Rana sangzhiensis – Sangzhi frog, Sangzhi groove-toed frog
 Rana shuchinae – Sichuan frog
 Rana sierrae – Sierra Nevada yellow-legged frog, Sierra Nevada Mountain yellow-legged frog
 Rana tagoi – Tago's brown frog
 Rana tavasensis  – Tavas frog
 Rana temporaria – Common frog, European common frog, European common brown frog, European grass frog
 Rana tsushimensis – Tsushima brown frog, Tsushima leopard frog
 Rana uenoi
 Rana ulma – Okinawa frog
 Rana zhengi
 Rana zhenhaiensis – Zhenhai brown frog

Alternative classifications
AmphibiaWeb includes the following species, arranged in subgenera:

Subgenus Amerana (Pacific brown frogs)
 Rana aurora – northern red-legged frog
 Rana boylii – foothill yellow-legged frog
 Rana cascadae – Cascades frog
 Rana draytonii – California red-legged frog
 Rana luteiventris – Columbia spotted frog
 Rana muscosa – southern mountain yellow-legged frog
 Rana pretiosa – Oregon spotted frog
 Rana sierrae – Sierra Nevada yellow-legged frog, Sierra Nevada Mountain yellow-legged frog

Subgenus Aquarana (North American water frogs)
 Rana catesbeiana Shaw, 1802 – American bullfrog
 Rana clamitans Latreille, 1801 – green frog, bronze frog, northern green frog
 Rana grylio Stejneger, 1901 – pig frog
 Rana heckscheri Wright, 1924 – river frog
 Rana okaloosae Moler, 1985 – Florida bog frog
 Rana septentrionalis Baird, 1854 – mink frog
 Rana virgatipes Cope, 1891 – carpenter frog

Subgenus Lithobates (neotropical true frogs)
 Rana bwana Hillis and de Sá, 1988 – Rio Chipillico frog
 Rana juliani Hillis and de Sá, 1988 – Maya Mountains frog
 Rana maculata Brocchi, 1877 
 Rana palmipes Spix, 1824 – Amazon River frog
 Rana vaillanti Brocchi, 1877 – Vaillant's frog
 Rana vibicaria (Cope, 1894)
 Rana warszewitschii Schmidt, 1857

Subgenus Liuhurana
 Rana shuchinae Liu, 1950

Subgenus Pantherana (leopard, pickerel and gopher frogs)
 Rana areolata Baird and Girard, 1852 – crawfish frog
 Rana berlandieri Baird, 1859 – Rio Grande leopard frog
 Rana blairi Mecham et al., 1973 – plains leopard frog
 Rana brownorum Sanders, 1973 – Gulf Coast leopard frog
 Rana capito LeConte, 1855 – Carolina gopher frog
 Rana chichicuahutla Cuellar, Méndez-De La Cruz, and Villagrán-Santa Cruz, 1996 
 Rana chiricahuensis Platz and Mecham, 1979 – Chiricahua leopard frog
 Rana dunni Zweifel, 1957 – Lake Patzcuaro frog
 Rana fisheri Stejneger, 1893 – Mogollon Rim leopard frog
 Rana forreri (Boulenger, 1883) – Forrer's leopard frog
 Rana kauffeldi Feinberg et al., 2014 – Atlantic Coast leopard frog
 Rana lemosespinali Smith and Chiszar, 2003
 Rana lenca (Luque-Montes et al., 2018)
 Rana macroglossa Brocchi, 1877 
 Rana magnaocularis Frost and Bagnara, 1974 
 Rana megapoda Taylor, 1942 
 Rana miadis Barbour and Loveridge, 1929 
 Rana montezumae Baird, 1854 
 Rana neovolcanica Hillis and Frost, 1985 
 Rana omiltemana Günther, 1900 
 Rana onca Cope, 1875 – relict leopard frog
 Rana palustris LeConte, 1825 – pickerel frog
 Rana pipiens Schreber, 1782 – northern leopard frog
 Rana sevosa Goin and Netting, 1940 – dusky gopher frog
 Rana spectabilis Hillis and Frost, 1985 – brilliant leopard frog
 Rana sphenocephala Cope, 1886 – southern leopard frog
 Rana taylori Smith, 1959 – Peralta frog
 Rana tlaloci Hillis and Frost, 1985 – Tlaloc's leopard frog
 Rana yavapaiensis Platz and Frost, 1984 – lowland leopard frog

Subgenus Pseudorana (Weining brown frog)
 Rana weiningensis

Subgenus Rana (Eurasian brown frogs)
 Rana amurensis – Siberian tree frog, Siberian wood frog, Amur brown frog
 Rana arvalis – moor frog
 Rana asiatica – Central Asiatic frog, Asian frog
 Rana camerani – long-legged wood frog
 Rana chaochiaoensis – Chaochiao frog
 Rana chensinensis – Asiatic grass frog, Chinese brown frog
 Rana chevronta – chevron-spotted brown frog
 Rana coreana – Korean brown frog
 Rana culaiensis – Culai brown frog
 Rana dalmatina – agile frog
 Rana dybowskii – Dybowski's frog
 Rana graeca – Greek stream frog, Greek frog
 Rana hanluica
 Rana holtzi – long-legged wood frog
 Rana huanrenensis – Huanren frog
 Rana iberica – Iberian frog
 Rana italica – Italian stream frog
 Rana japonica – Japanese brown frog
 Rana jiemuxiensis – Jiemuxi brown frog
 Rana johnsi – Johns' groove-toed frog
 Rana kobai – Ryukyu brown frog
 Rana kukunoris – plateau brown frog
 Rana latastei – Italian agile frog, Lataste's frog
 Rana longicrus – Taipa frog
 Rana macrocnemis – long-legged wood frog, Caucasus frog, Turkish frog, Brusa frog
 Rana maoershanensis
 Rana neba
 Rana omeimontis – Omei brown frog, Omei wood frog
 Rana ornativentris – montane brown frog, Nikkō frog
 Rana pirica – Hokkaidō frog
 Rana pseudodalmatina
 Rana pyrenaica – Pyrenean frog, Pyrenees frog
 Rana sakuraii – stream brown frog, Napparagawa frog
 Rana sangzhiensis
 Rana sauteri – Sauter's brown frog, Kanshirei village frog, Taiwan groove-toed frog, Taiwan pseudotorrent frog 
 Rana tagoi – Tago's brown frog
 Rana tavasensis – Tavas brown frog
 Rana temporaria – common frog, European common frog, European common brown frog, European grass frog
 Rana tsushimensis – Tsushima brown frog, Tsushima leopard frog
 Rana uenoi
 Rana ulma
 Rana zhengi
 Rana zhenhaiensis – Zhenhai brown frog

Subgenus Zweifelia (Mexican torrent frogs)
 Rana johni Blair, 1965
 Rana psilonota Webb, 2001 
 Rana pueblae Zweifel, 1955
 Rana pustulosa (Boulenger, 1883) 
 Rana sierramadrensis Taylor, 1939 
 Rana tarahumarae (Boulenger, 1917) – Tarahumara frog
 Rana zweifeli Hillis, Frost, and Webb, 1984 – Zweifel's frog

Incertae sedis (no assigned subgenus)

 Rana dabieshanensis Wang et al., 2017
 Rana luanchuanensis Zhao and Yuan, 2017
 Rana sylvatica LeConte, 1825 – wood frog

Notes on other taxonomic arrangements:

The harpist brown frog, Kampira Falls frog, or Yaeyama harpist frog was formerly known as R. psaltes; it was subsequently identified as the long-known R. okinavana. The latter name has been misapplied to the Ryūkyū brown frog, but the harpist brown frog is a rather distinct species that apparently belongs in Babina or Nidirana if these are considered valid.

References

Further reading

External links

AmphibiaWeb
Amphibian and Reptiles of Peninsular Malaysia

 
True frogs
Amphibian genera
Taxa named by Carl Linnaeus